Dunoon is a small village within the City of Lismore LGA in the Northern Rivers region of New South Wales, Australia. In the  the population was 824. It is self-proclaimed as the Macadamia capital of Australia.

The village's local newspaper is The Dunoon and District Gazette, with past copies available at the Lismore Library and the Richmond River Historical Society.

Services 

Like the other small villages dotted along the ridges in the hills heading north out of Lismore, it is a quiet town, but the community and sports facilities available give it a strong community spirit.  There is a post office, primary school, mechanic, herbalist and general store/ bottle shop.  Dunoon has a community hall with a variety of activities including the Dunoon Film Club, exercise classes, social events and church services. Many community gatherings occur at the Sports Club. The popular sports are cricket and football, although there are other sports such as Little Athletics and tennis. The Dunoon sports club also has a restaurant, a playground, a tennis court and football fields with lights.

Dunoon also has two actively used church buildings; one Catholic and the other Anglican. The Anglican church building was destroyed during the 2007 tornado and has since been rebuilt. The other two former church buildings have been / are being converted to residential use, with both retaining many of the original features.

Development 

Dunoon is currently predominantly a unilinear development, but a major land release has expanded off the main ridge.  Community concerns over the social impact on the town of a second development were allayed in February 2009 when developers withdrew their application to develop a new subdivision from Lismore City Council.

Rous County Council, which is the authority responsible for the water supply for most of the Ballina, Byron, Lismore and Richmond Valley council areas, published its draft water strategy in June 2020, which includes a  dam at Dunoon. The council has been aware of Indigenous concerns since the matter was first considered in the 1990s, and was committed to working with local communities to mitigate concerns. An impact assessment of the site had identified various artefacts and burial sites in the area.

2007 Tornado
On 26 October 2007, a tornado struck Dunoon (mainly the southern part of the village), and it was captured on video as it struck a direct hit on an electrical transformer station. The tornado also completely destroyed one house, severely damaged a church and two classrooms at a school, with other houses in the village also having roofs torn off and windows smashed. The rebuilding of the school classrooms and church has been an opportunity to modernise and revitalise.

References

External links
 Dunoon and District Gazette
 Northern Rivers Geology Blog - Dunoon
 Lost Dunoon Facebook Page

Towns in New South Wales
Northern Rivers
City of Lismore